IMC Group may refer to:

International Metalworking Companies, the second largest company for metalworking products
International Media JS Company, a Vietnamese multimedia group known as IMC Group, who own MTV (Vietnam)